Michalis Iordanidis (born 1 January 1962) is a Greek retired soccer striker and later manager.

References

1962 births
Living people
Greek footballers
Kavala F.C. players
Makedonikos F.C. players
PAOK FC players
Apollon Pontou FC players
Doxa Drama F.C. players
Ionikos F.C. players
Trikala F.C. players
Super League Greece players
Association football forwards
Greek football managers
Trikala F.C. managers
Panathinaikos F.C. non-playing staff
Kavala F.C. managers
Footballers from Kavala